"Nun lasst uns den Leib begraben" (or ...laßt...; ...lasset...) is a Lutheran hymn for funerals. It may also refer to

 Nun lasset uns den Leib begraben, BWV 1111, one of the Neumeister Chorales by Johann Sebastian Bach
 "Nun laßt uns den Leib begraben", D 168 (Schubert) a part song for mixed choir and piano by Franz Schubert